Crossfire is a Canadian current affairs television program which aired on CBC Television in April 1956, and which featured debate and panel show formats.

Premise
This program was a mid-season replacement for Citizens' Forum during April 1956. In some episodes of Crossfire, a studio audience posed questions to several experts on a particular topic. Other episodes featured a debate for or against a given subject, resembling a court cross-examination, with a studio audience deciding the winning side of the argument.

 3 April 1956 - debut
 10 April 1956 - pre-empted for an NHL hockey playoffs broadcast
 17 April 1956 - "Comic Books - Harmless or Dangerous?", under the audience question format
 24 April 1956 - "Youth Wants to Know - How to be a Success" - an audience of youths poses questions to an expert panel

Broadcast
This half-hour program was broadcast on Tuesdays at 10:00 p.m. (Eastern) from 3 to 24 April 1956.

References

External links
 

CBC Television original programming
1956 Canadian television series debuts
1956 Canadian television series endings
1950s Canadian television talk shows
Black-and-white Canadian television shows